John Malcolm Forbes (1847 – February 19, 1904) was an American businessman and sportsman. He was born in Milton, Massachusetts in 1847 into the wealthy Forbes family of Boston, with his father being John Murray Forbes. He was a prominent yachtsman and breeder of Standardbred horses.

Horses
Forbes has been described as one of the most important harness racing breeders of all time.  In 1890 he purchased Jack, 2:12, for a speedway horse. As his interest grew he established Forbes Farm by buying and consolidating the Hunt, Davenport and Farrington farms. The Farrington farmhouse once stood on the site of the current Prowse residence.

He purchased Nancy Hanks for $41,000 and Arion for $125,000. With Arion, Bingen, Nancy Hanks, Peter The Great, and others, Forbes Farm became the outstanding stud farm in the East. Forbes main objective is to improve the quality of the light driving horse, which, before the advent of the automobile, was in great demand throughout the country. Though Forbes never raced a stable, he was an expert on breeding fast horses, until his death in 1904.

Forbes made national headlines by paying Senator Leland Stanford of California the enormous sum, at the time, of $125,000 for the stallion Arion.  At the time this was highest price ever paid for a horse anywhere in the world. Adding Bingen and Peter the Great, Forbes owned the three fastest trotting stallions. He added the legendary undefeated mare Nancy Hanks, model for the horse and sulky weathervanes one sees today. These horses were inducted into the Standardbred Hall of Fame.

Business

By 1890, Forbes was a well-known businessman and also an avid sportsman.

America's Cup

Forbes owned and skippered the yacht Puritan which successfully defended the America's Cup in 1885.

In 1885, Forbes led the first of three successful America's Cup defense efforts for the New York Yacht Club. Edward Burgess was the designer and the syndicate initially funded and campaigned Puritan to a successful defence in 1885 and became a template for America's Cup campaign management which was used throughout the 20th century.

Descendants
Forbes is the ancestor of American television producer Jonathan Meath.

His daughter Amelia Forbes also married into the Emerson family (his brother, William Hathaway Forbes married Edith Emerson, daughter of Ralph Waldo Emerson):

References
 The complete book of harness racing by Philip A Pines
 Canton Historical Society.

External links
 Tennessee Coal, Iron and Railroad Company 1899 signed by J. Malcolm Forbes at www.scripophily.net

America's Cup sailors
American male sailors (sport)
John Malcolm
1847 births
1904 deaths